Stanley Yelnats' Survival Guide to Camp Green Lake is a 2003 novel for young adults by Louis Sachar, first published by Yearling Books (Random House). It is the second in a series inaugurated in 1998 by the award-winning Holes.

Survival Guide is a "tongue-in-cheek handbook for newcomers" to Camp Green Lake, for a "more pleasant" trip than the one featured in Holes.

As of May 18, 2003, the book was ranked 8th by The New York Times on its list of bestselling Children's Paperback Books.

It was released just over a month before the release of the film version of Holes.

References

External links
|Louis Sachar's Website's page on the Book

2003 American novels
Novels by Louis Sachar
American young adult novels
Sequel novels